The Knik Site, (Dena'ina: K'enakatnu) also known as the Old Knik Townsite, is the location in Matanuska-Susitna Borough, Alaska that was once home to the largest settlement on Cook Inlet. The only surviving remnants of the community are a former log roadhouse, now a museum operated by the Wasilla-Knik Historical Society, and a log cabin. The Knik area had long been a meeting point of Native Alaskans, and in 1898 it became the principal community on Cook Inlet from which goods were shipped into the interior. In 1916 the Alaska Railroad reached the site of present-day Anchorage, bypassing Knik and leading to Anchorage's growth. When the railroad reached Wasilla, Knik lost all importance as a transshipment point, and its buildings were either abandoned or moved to one of the other communities.

The two surviving buildings were listed on the National Register of Historic Places in 1973.

See also
National Register of Historic Places listings in Matanuska-Susitna Borough, Alaska

References

External links
 Wasilla-Knik Historical Society Museums

Ghost towns in Alaska
History museums in Alaska
Museums in Matanuska-Susitna Borough, Alaska
Buildings and structures on the National Register of Historic Places in Matanuska-Susitna Borough, Alaska
Log buildings and structures on the National Register of Historic Places in Alaska
Populated places on the National Register of Historic Places in Alaska
Denaʼina
Ghost towns in the United States
Ghost towns in North America
Towns in the United States